A political family of Australia (also called a political dynasty) is a family in which multiple members are involved in Australian politics, particularly electoral politics. Members may be related by blood or marriage; often several generations or multiple siblings may be involved.

Anderson family
 Keith Anderson, member of the NSW Legislative Assembly 1961–1962
 Kath Anderson, member of the New South Wales Legislative Council 1973–1981
 Peter Anderson, member of the NSW Legislative Assembly 1978–1995

Anthony family

Larry Anthony, senior: MHR for Richmond 1937–57; minister in the Menzies Government 1941, 1949–56
Doug Anthony: MHR for Richmond 1957–84; Deputy Prime Minister 1971–72, 1975–83; Leader of the National Party 1971–84
Larry Anthony, junior: MHR for Richmond 1996–2004; minister in the Howard Government 1998–2004.

Archer family

 Thomas Archer, Legislative Council of Tasmania 1827–1844
 Joseph Archer, Legislative Council of Tasmania 1851–1853
 William Archer, Legislative Council & House of Assembly of Tasmania, 1851–1855(MLC)/1860-1862 & 1866–1868 (MHA)
 Robert Joseph Archer, House of Assembly of Tasmania 1869–1871, Longford Municipality Alderman
 Basil Archer, House of Assembly of Tasmania 1871–1872
 William Henry Davies Archer, House of Assembly of Tasmania, 1882–1886, Longford Municipality Alderman, Council Warden, Treasurer 1872–1894
 Frank Archer,	House of Assembly of Tasmania, 1893–1902
 William Fulbert Archer, Longford Municipality Alderman
 Thomas Cathcart Archer, Longford Municipality Alderman

Baird family
 Bruce Baird (born 1942), MLA for Northcott NSW 1984—95, Minister in Greiner and Fahey governments. MHR for Cook 1998—2007. His son:
 Mike Baird (born 1968), MLA for Manly NSW 2007—2017, Minister, Treasurer, 44th NSW Premier 2014—2017

Barnard family

Claude Barnard: MHR for Bass 1934–49. His son:
Lance Barnard: MHR for Bass 1954–75, Deputy Prime Minister 1972–74
Eric Barnard: nephew of Claude Barnard; minister in Tasmanian governments.
Michael Barnard: grandson of Claude Barnard and nephew of Lance; state MHA for Bass 1969–86; Deputy Premier of Tasmania

Baume family
 Michael Baume (born 1930), Member of the Australian House of Representatives for Macarthur (1975—1983), Australian Senator for New South Wales (1985—1996)
 Peter Baume (born 1935), Australian Senator for New South Wales (1974—1991)
They are cousins, the grandsons of Frederick Baume, a member of parliament in New Zealand.

Beale-Shorten family 

Sir Howard Beale (1898–1983) – federal member for Parramatta (1946–1958), and at various times held the Transport, Supply, and Defense Production ministries. He later became the ambassador to the United States (1958–1964)
Julian Beale (1934–2021) – federal member for Deakin (1984–90) and Bruce (1990–96) for the Liberal Party. Son of Howard
Bill Shorten (born 1967) – federal Leader of the Opposition (2013–2019) and member for Maribyrnong (2007–present). In addition to holding several ministries in the Rudd and Gillard governments he was also the Victorian state president of the Labor Party (2005–2008) and the Secretary of the Australian Workers Union (2001–2007). Son-in-law of Julian from his first marriage
 Dame Quentin Bryce (born 1942) – Governor of Queensland (2003–2008) and Governor General of Australia (2008–2014). Mother-in-law of Bill from his second marriage

Beazley family

Kim Edward Beazley (1917–2007): MHR for Fremantle 1945–1977; Minister for Education in the Whitlam Government. His son,
Kim Christian Beazley (born 1948): MHR 1980–2007; Minister in the Hawke and Keating governments 1983–1996; Deputy Prime Minister 1995–96; Leader of the Australian Labor Party and Leader of the Opposition 1996–2001, 2005–2006; Australian Ambassador to the United States 2010–2016; Governor of Western Australia 2018-. His daughter,
Hannah Mary Beazley: MLA for Victoria Park 2021–

Bjelke-Petersen family

 Sir Joh Bjelke-Petersen was premier of Queensland from 1968 to 1987
 Lady Florence Bjelke-Petersen, his wife, was a Senator for Queensland from 1981 to 1993

Braid family
Harry Braid (1917–2001) was an independent member of the Tasmanian Legislative Council for Mersey from 1972 to 1990.
His daughter Sue Napier (1948–2010) was a Liberal member of the House of Assembly for Bass from 1992 to 2010.
His cousin Ian Braid was a Liberal MHA for Wilmot/Lyons from 1969 to 1972 and 1975 to 1995.

Brown-Hoare family
 Bob Brown was an ALP MHR for Hunter 1980–84 and Charlton 1984–98; his daughter
 Kelly Hoare succeeded him in Charlton as member 1998–2007.

Bruxner family
 Sir Michael Bruxner, MLA 1920–1962, First Deputy Premier of New South Wales.
 Tim Bruxner, MLA 1962–1981, Cabinet Minister 1973–1976.

Burke family
Tom Burke (1910–1973) (MHR for Perth) 1943–55. Sons;
Terry Burke (born 1942) (MP for Perth) 1968–87. 
Brian Burke (born 1947) (MP for Balga). Premier of Western Australia 1983–88.

Butler family
Sir Richard B. Butler
Sir Richard L. Butler (his son)
conservative Premiers of South Australia
their great-grandson and grandson respectively
Mark Butler (MP for Port Adelaide 2007–2019 and Hindmarsh 2019–

Cain family
 John Cain (senior) (1882–1957) (MP for Northcote) 1927–1957. Premier of Victoria 1943, 1945–47, 1952–55. Son: 
 John Cain (junior) (born 1931) (MP for Bundoora) 1976–92. Premier of Victoria 1982–90.

Chaney family
Sir Fred Chaney I (1914–2001) (MHR for Perth) 1955–69. and Lord Mayor of Perth 1978–82. Son;
Fred Chaney II (born 1941) (Senator for WA) Leader of the Opposition in the Senate 1983–90. (MHR for Pearce) 1990–93.  Senior Minister in the Fraser Government.
Kate Chaney: granddaughter of Fred Chaney Sr, niece of Fred Chaney Jr, (MHR for Curtin) 2022–present

Chapman family
Ted Chapman (1934–2005) (MP for Alexandra) 1973–1992. Liberal government minister 1979–1982. Father;
Vickie Chapman (born 1957) (MP for Bragg) 2002–present. Deputy Liberal Opposition Leader 2006–2009 and 2013–present. Daughter.

Chataway family
Brothers
James Vincent Chataway (1852–1901) was a member of the Queensland Legislative Assembly
Thomas Drinkwater Chataway (1864–1925) Australian Senator for Queensland

Court family
Sir Charles Court (1911–2007) (MP for Nedlands) 1953–1982. Premier of Western Australia 1974–82. Son;
Richard Court (born 1947), (MP for Nedlands)1982–2001. Premier of Western Australia from 1993 to 2001. 
 Ken Court, Charles Court's son, state president of the Liberal Party in Western Australia and candidate for the seat of Curtin, losing to Allan Rocher
Margaret Court (born 1942) Tennis player and political activist and wife of Barry Court, Sir Charles Court's eldest son.

Cowan family (SA)
James Cowan (1848–1890), Member for the South Australian House of Assembly (MHA) Electoral district of Yatala 1890
John Cowan (1866–1953), Member of the South Australian Legislative Council 1910 – 1944
John Lancelot Cowan (1893–1971), South Australian Legislative Council 1949 – 1959
Thomas Cowan (1839–1890) MHA for Yatala 1875 – 1878

Cowan (Brown, Wittenoom) Family (WA)
Walkinshaw Cowan (1808–1888), private secretary to Western Australian Governors John Hutt, Andrew Clarke and Frederick Irwin 
Thomas Brown (1803–1863), Member of the Western Australian Legislative Council (1850s)
Edith Cowan (1861–1932), Member of the Legislative Assembly of Western Australia (12 March 1921 – 22 March 1924). Granddaughter of Thomas Brown and Daughter-in-Law of Walkinshaw Cowan.
Edward Wittenoom (1854–1936), Member of the Legislative Council of Western Australia (30 May 1883 – 23 January 1884 and 25 June 1885 – 6 November 1886) First cousin of Edith Cowan
Hendy Cowan (born 25 April 1943) is a former deputy premier of Western Australia. Grandson of Walkinshaw Cowan and nephew of Edith Cowan

Crean family
Frank Crean (1916–2008) (MHR for Melbourne Ports) 1951–77, Deputy Prime Minister of Australia 1972–75. Sons;
Simon Crean (born 1949) (MHR for Hotham) 1990–2013. Leader of the Australian Opposition 2001–2003. Leader of the Australian Labor Party 2001–2003. Minister in the Keating and Rudd Governments.
David Crean (born 1950) (MP for Denison (Tasmania)) 1989–90. (MLC for Elwick (Tasmania)) 1999–2004.

Cribb/Foote family
 Benjamin Cribb (1807—1874), Member of the New South Wales Legislative Assembly for Stanley Boroughs (1858–1859), Member of the Queensland Legislative Assembly for West Moreton (1861–1867) and Ipswich (1870–1873)
 Benjamin's brother Robert Cribb (1805—1893), Member of the New South Wales Legislative Assembly for East Moreton (1859–1859), Member of the Queensland Legislative Assembly for Town of Brisbane (1860—1863) and East Moreton (1863—1867)
 Benjamin's son Thomas Bridson Cribb (1845—1913), Member of the Queensland Legislative Council (1893—1896), Member of the Queensland Legislative Assembly for Ipswich (1896—1904), Treasurer of Queensland (1901—1903), Member of the Queensland Legislative Council (1913)
 Benjamin's son James Clarke Cribb (1856–1926), Member of the Queensland Legislative Assembly for Rosewood (1893—1896), Bundamba (1899—1912) and Bremer (1912—1915)
 Benjamin's brother-in-law and business partner John Clarke Foote (1822—1895), Member of the Queensland Legislative Council (1877—1895)
 John's brother James Foote (1829–1895), Member of the Queensland Legislative Assembly for West Moreton (1873—1878), Bundamba (1880—1888) and Rosewood (1892—1893)

Darling family
John Darling Sr. (1831–1905), South Australian House of Assembly Member (MHA) for West Adelaide 1870 – 1871
John Darling Jr. (1852–1914), MHA 1896 – 1905, 11th Leader of the Opposition (SA)

Douglas family
John Douglas – Premier of Queensland 1877–1879. Son;
Henry Douglas – state member for Cook 1907–1915. Grandson;
Alex Douglas – state member for Gaven 2006 and 2009–2015. Alex Douglas is also a nephew of Bob Katter and cousin of Rob Katter (see Katter family below)
Ian Douglas – Queensland Political Candidate 2004 State Election – Electorate: Toowoomba North, National Party

Downer family

Sir John Downer (1843–1915), (MP for Barossa) 1878–1901. Premier of South Australia 1885–87 1892–93. (Senator for SA) 1901–03. (MLC for Southern District) 1905–15.
Sir Alexander Russell Downer, "Alick" (1910–1981), (MHR for Angas) 1949–64. Senior Minister in the Menzies Ministry. Australian High Commissioner to the United Kingdom 1964–72.
Alexander John Downer, (born 1951), (MHR for Mayo) 1984–2008. Leader of the Australian Opposition 1994–95. Senior Minister in the Howard Government. High Commissioner to the UK 2014–2018. 
His daughter Georgina Downer ran unsuccessfully for Liberal party preselection for the seat of Goldstein prior to the 2016 federal election, and was the unsuccessful Liberal candidate for the 2018 Mayo by-election and the 2019 federal election.

Dunn family
John Dunn Snr. South Australian miller and philanthropist, sat in both Houses of the Parliament of South Australia
his sons:
John Dunn Jnr. South Australian miller, sat in both Houses
William Henry Dunn miller and farmer, member of the Legislative Assembly for Onkaparinga
John Dunn Snr's son-in-law and nephew:
William Paltridge (married Elizabeth Dunn ca.1835 – 20 August 1928) farmer, member for Victoria (April 1870 – July 1871) in the South Australian House of Assembly

Evans family
Stan Evans (born 1930) (MP for three electorates: Onkaparinga, Fisher and Davenport) 1968–1993. Father;
Iain Evans (born 1959) (MP for Davenport) 1993–2014. Liberal Opposition Leader 2006–2007. Deputy Liberal Opposition Leader 2005–2006. Liberal government minister 1997–2002. Son.

Farrell family 
 David Farrell (1891–1953), Member of the Queensland Legislative Assembly for Maryborough
 George Farrell (1895–1966), Member of the Queensland Legislative Assembly for Rockhampton, his brother

Ferguson family
Jack Ferguson (1924–2002) (MP for Merrylands) 1959–62, 1968–84 and Fairfield 1962–68. Deputy Premier of New South Wales 1976–84. Sons;
Laurie Ferguson (born 1952) (MHR for Reid) 1990–2010.
Martin Ferguson (born 1953) (MHR for Batman) 1996–2013. Minister in the Rudd Government

Fong Lim family
Alec Fong Lim (1931–1990) (Lord Mayor of Darwin) 1984–90. His daughter;
Katrina Fong Lim (1961–) (Lord Mayor of Darwin) 2012–.

Fraser family
Sir Simon Fraser (1832–1919) (Senator for VIC) 1901–06. Grandson;
Malcolm Fraser (1930–2015) (MHR for Wannon) 1955–83. Minister in the Holt, McEwen, Gorton and McMahon Ministries. 22nd Prime Minister of Australia 1975–83.

Goldsworthy–Chapman family
Roger Goldsworthy MHA, AO (1929 –) first Member for Kavel 1970–1992, 3rd Deputy Premier of South Australia 1979–1982, various ministries, father of
Mark Goldsworthy (1956 –) third and current Member for Kavel since 2002
Grant Chapman (1949–) (Roger Goldsworthy's brother-in-law) MHR for Kingston, Senator for South Australia

Gullett family
Henry Gullett (1837–1914) was a member of the New South Wales Legislative Council from 1908 till 1914.
Sir Henry Gullett (1878–1940) was the nephew of the New South Wales politician of the same name. He won the Victorian seat of Henty of the House of Representatives and held it from 1925 till his death in 1940 in a plane crash, at which time he was a government minister.
Jo Gullett (1914–1999) won his father’s old seat of Henty in the House of Representatives and held it from 1946 to 1955. During some of that time he also served as government whip.

Groom family
 William Henry Groom
 his sons:
 Littleton Ernest Groom
 Henry Littleton Groom

Hamer family
 Sir Rupert "Dick" Hamer (1916–2004), 39th Premier of Victoria 1972–1981. His younger brother;
 David Hamer (1923–2002) (MHR for Isaacs) 1969–1974. Australian Senator for Victoria 1978–1990. His grandfather-in-law;
 Sir William Murray McPherson (1865–1932) 31st Premier of Victoria, Treasurer of Victoria. Member for Hawthorn (1913–30). His father;
 Thomas McPherson, Mayor of Melbourne (1870–71)
 The uncle of Sir Rupert and David;
 George Swinburne (1861–1928), Member for Hawthorn in the Victorian Legislative Assembly (1902–1913). Founder of Swinburne University.

Hawke family
Albert Hawke (1900–86) MHA for Burra Burra, South Australia 1924–27, MLA for Northam, Western Australia 1933–68. Premier of Western Australia 1953–59. Brother;
Arthur Clarence "Clem" Hawke (1898–1989) General Secretary; Australian Labor Party, South Australia 1919–1920. Minister of the Congregational Church 1920–1979. Son;
Bob Hawke (1929–2019) MHR for Wills 1980–92. 23rd Prime Minister of Australia 1983–91.

Hodgman family

Hughes-Turnbull family
The Hughes family has a long history in both New South Wales and Federal politics. 
Sir Thomas Hughes was the first Lord Mayor of Sydney and member of the New South Wales Legislative Council from 1908 until 1930. His brother, 
John Francis Hughes was also an MLC, serving from 1895 until 1912. He also served as NSW Minister for Justice and Vice-President of the Executive Council. Their brother in-law,
John Lane Mullins, husband of Jane Hughes; sister of Sir Thomas and John Hughes, was also an MLC from 1917 until 1934. Their grandson and his great-nephew, 
Tom Hughes, was a Liberal Party of Australia member of the Australian House of Representatives from 1963 until 1972, serving as Attorney-General during the Gorton Government. His daughter, 
Lucy Hughes, was the first female Lord Mayor of Sydney, serving from 2003 until 2004. She is married to 
Malcolm Turnbull, the Prime Minister of Australia and Leader of the Liberal Party from September 2015 until August 2018, and member for Wentworth 2004–18. He is the former Leader of the Opposition, having served in that role from 2008 until 2009. He served as Parliamentary Secretary to the Prime Minister and Minister for the Environment during the Howard Government, and until taking on the role of Prime Minister, he served as the Minister for Communications in the Abbott Government.

Katter family

Bob Katter Sr., state candidate for Flinders 1957–1958, federal member for Kennedy 1966–1990.
Bob Katter, state member for Flinders 1974–1992, federal member for Kennedy 1992–present. Bob Katter is also an uncle of Alex Douglas (see Douglas family above).
Robbie Katter, state member for Mount Isa 2012–present
Carl Katter, federal candidate for Higgins 2015–2016

Lewis family
Brothers
Sandy Lewis (1931–2016), MP for Blackwood, Western Australia 1972–1989
Tom Lewis (1922 –2016), 33rd Premier of New South Wales 1975 – 1976
their grandfather
John Lewis (1844–1923), member of the South Australian Legislative Council 1898 – 1923

Littleproud family 
 Brian Littleproud, (1941 –  ), Member of the Queensland Legislative Assembly 1983 – 2001, and his son:
 David Littleproud, (1976 –  ), Member of the Australian House of Representativies 2016 –

Lyons family
Joseph Lyons (1879–1939) was Tasmanian Leader of the Opposition 1916–23, 1928–29; Premier of Tasmania 1923–28; federal Member for Wilmot 1929–39; Leader of the Opposition 1931–32; 10th Prime Minister of Australia 1932–39. Wife;
Dame Enid Lyons (1897–1981) was MHR for Darwin 1943–51. First female member of the House of Representatives. Minister in the Menzies Government. Sons;
Kevin Lyons (1923–2000): MP for Braddon (TAS) 1948–69. Deputy Premier of Tasmania 1969–72. Brother;
Brendan Lyons: MP for Bass (TAS) 1982–86.

McClelland family
Alfred McClelland, (dec.) (MP for Northern Tablelands) 1920–27, (Dubbo) 1930–32. Son;
Doug McClelland (born 1926) (Senator for NSW) 1962–87. Minister in the Whitlam Government and President of the Australian Senate. Son;
Robert McClelland (born 1958) (MHR for Barton) 1996–2013 and was a minister in the Rudd-Gillard Government.

McGirr family
Greg McGirr
James McGirr, 28th Premier of NSW (6 February 1947 – 2 April 1952)
Joe McGirr (born 19 June 1960), Independent Member for the NSW Electoral district of Wagga Wagga

McLarty family
John McLarty (1842–1909), MLA in Western Australia 1904–1909; brother of Edward
Edward McLarty (1848–1917), MLC in Western Australia 1894–1916; brother of John
Ross McLarty (1891–1962), MLA in Western Australia 1930–1962, Premier 1947–1953; son of Edward

McMahon/Walder family
William McMahon (1908–1988), federal Member for Lowe; Minister in the Menzies Government (1949–66), Holt Government (1966–67), McEwen Government (1967–68) and Gorton Government (1968–1971); 20th Prime Minister of Australia 1971–72. Uncle;
Samuel Walder (1879–1946), Lord Mayor of Sydney 1932–33, Member of the Legislative Council of New South Wales 1932–43

Melloy/Darling family
 Jack Melloy (1908—2006), Member of the Queensland Legislative Assembly for Nudgee (1960—1977)
 his daughter Elaine Darling (born 1936), Member of the Australian House of Representatives for Lilley (1980—1993)
 his granddaughter and her daughter Vicky Darling (born 1966), Member of the Queensland Legislative Assembly for Sandgate (2006—2012), Minister for Environment (2011—2012)
 his cousin once removed and role model, Walter Russell Crampton (1877—1938), Member of the Queensland Legislative Council (1917—1922)

Menzies-Leckie family
 Sir Robert Menzies, 12th and longest serving Prime Minister of Australia. Member of the Australian House of Representatives for Kooyong (1934—1966), Deputy Premier of Victoria (1932–1934) and Member of the Legislative Assembly of Victoria for Nunawading (1929–1934). 
his father James Menzies, was a Member of the Legislative Assembly of Victoria for Lowan (1911–1920) 
 his uncle Hugh Menzies, was a Member of the Legislative Assembly of Victoria for Stawell (1902–1904)
 his uncle Sydney Sampson was a Member of the Australian House of Representatives for Wimmera (1906–1919)
 his father in-law John Leckie was a Member of the Australian House of Representatives for Indi (1917–1919) and Senator for Victoria (1935–1947) 
 his brother in-law Roland Leckie was a Member of the Legislative Assembly of Victoria for Evelyn (1950–1952) 
 his cousin Douglas Menzies was a Judge on the High Court of Australia (1958–1974)

Morgan family 
 James Morgan, Member for Warwick in the Queensland Legislative Assembly (1870–1871, 1873–1878)
 his son Arthur Morgan, Premier of Queensland (1903–1906)
 his son Arthur Morgan, Member of the Australian House of Representatives for Darling Downs (1929–1931)

Morris-Wilson family

 David Morris was a councillor in the Shire of Mornington (1987-1994) and is member for Mornington in the Victorian Legislative Assembly (2006-present). His stepson
 Tim Wilson, Member of the Australian House of Representatives for Goldstein (2016-2022)

Nalder family
Sir Crawford Nalder was Deputy Premier of Western Australia from 1962 to 1971. His son
Cambell Nalder, was a member of the Western Australian Legislative Assembly from 1986 to 1987. His son
Dean Nalder, has been a member of the Legislative Assembly since 2013 and was the Transport minister in the Western Australian Government.

Newman family
Kevin Newman (1933–99) – (MP for Bass (TAS)) 1975–84. Minister in the Fraser Government. His wife
Jocelyn Newman (1937–2018) – (Senator for Tasmania) 1986–2002. She was a Minister in the Howard Government. Their son; 
Campbell Newman (born 1963) – Lord Mayor of Brisbane 2004–2011, Premier of Queensland 2012–2015.

Nott family
 Frederick Lancelot Nott (1874—1927), Member of the Queensland Legislative Assembly for Stanley (1920—1927)
 his brother Lewis Windermere Nott (1886—1951), Member of the Australian House of Representatives for Herbert (1925—1928) and Australian Capital Territory (1949—1951)

O'Sullivan/MacGroarty family 
 Patrick O'Sullivan, Member of the Queensland Legislative Assembly for Ipswich
 His son, Thomas O'Sullivan, Member of the Queensland Legislative Assembly for Warwick and Member of the Queensland Legislative Council
 His grandson, Neil O'Sullivan, Australian Senator for Queensland
 His uncle Neil MacGroarty

Oldfield family
 Edward "Ted" Oldfield (1920–1990), Member of the Western Australian Legislative Assembly for Maylands (1951–1956; 1962–1965) and Mount Lawley (1956–1962)
 his nephew David Oldfield (1958–present), co-founder and Vice President of Pauline Hanson's One Nation (1997–2000), President of One Nation New South Wales (2001–2004), Member of the New South Wales Legislative Council (1999–2007)

Palaszczuk family
Henry Palaszczuk (born 1947) – Queensland state member for Archerfield 1984–1992 and Inala 1992–2006, and a Minister in the Beattie Government. Daughter;
Annastacia Palaszczuk (born 1969) – Queensland state member for Inala since 2006 and Premier of Queensland since 2015.

Pearsall family
Benjamin Pearsall (1878–1951) – Independent member of the Tasmanian House of Assembly for Franklin 1928–1931, 1934–1937
Benjamin's son, Thomas Pearsall (1920–2003) – Liberal MHA for Franklin 1950–1966, member of the House of Representatives for Franklin 1966–1969
Thomas' son, Geoff Pearsall (born 1946) – Liberal MHA for Franklin 1969–1988, Deputy Premier of Tasmania 1984–1988

Piesse family
 Frederick Piesse (1853–1912), MLA in Western Australia 1890–1909; brother of Alfred, Arnold, and Charles
 Charles Piesse (1855–1914), MLC in Western Australia 1894–1914; brother of Alfred, Arnold, and Frederick
 Alfred Piesse (1866–1939), MLA in Western Australia 1911–1924; brother of Arnold, Charles, and Frederick
 Arnold Piesse (1872–1935), MLA in Western Australia 1909–1914 and 1930–1935; brother of Alfred, Charles, and Frederick
 Harold Piesse (1884–1944), MLC in Western Australia 1932–1944; son of Frederick
 Edmund Piesse (1900–1952), Senator for Western Australia 1950–1952; son of Arnold
 Winifred Piesse (born 1923), MLC in Western Australia 1977–1983; daughter-in-law of Charles

Pitt family
Warren Pitt (born 1948) – state member for Mulgrave 1989–1995 and 1998–2009 and a Minister in the Beattie Government. Son;
Curtis Pitt (born 1977) –  state member for Mulgrave 2009–present and a Minister in the Palaszczuk Government.

Playford family

The Playford family has played a significant role in the South Australian and Australian political and social sphere since the early days of European settlement.
Thomas Playford Senior was a fiery Baptist minister who arrived in Adelaide in 1844 and established 'The Christian Church'.
Thomas Playford II (1837–1915) (MP for Onkaparinga (S.A)) Premier of South Australia 1887–89, 1890–92. (Senator for SA) Federal Minister for Defence 1905–07 and Vice-President of the Executive Council 1903–04.
Sir Thomas Playford IV Premier of South Australia 1938–65. (the longest serving elected national or regional leader in the Commonwealth of Nations.)

Spender 

 Sir Percy Spender, KCVO KBE QC: Member of parliament for Warringah (1937-51) where he held a number of ministries including treasurer, ambassador to the United States (1951-57) and judge on the International Court of Justice (1958-67) including as president (1964-67)
 John Spender QC: Member of parliament for North Sydney (1980-90), and ambassadors to France (1996-2000), son of Percy
 Allegra Spender: Independent Member for Wentworth elected at the 2022 federal election, daughter of John

Street family 

 John Rendell Street, MLC (b.1832–d.1891): Founder of the Australian Street dynasty; successor of Sir Edmund Barton, 1st Prime Minister of Australia, in his New South Wales Legislative Assembly seat of East Sydney (1887–death); descendant of Baron Sir Thomas Street.
 Sir Philip Whistler Street, KCMG, KC (b.1863–d.1938): 8th Chief Justice of the Supreme Court of New South Wales and Lieutenant-Governor of New South Wales (1925–1938); second longest serving judge in New South Wales history; son of John Rendell, father of Sir Kenneth.
 Lieutenant Colonel Sir Kenneth Whistler Street, KCMG, KStJ, QC (b.1890–d.1972): 10th Chief Justice of the Supreme Court of New South Wales and Lieutenant-Governor of New South Wales (1950–1972); son of Sir Philip, husband of "Red Jessie", father of Sir Laurence.
 Jessie Mary Grey, Lady Street (b.1889–d.1970): Prominent diplomat and suffragette; Australia's first female delegate to the United Nations; instrumental in the gender non-discrimination clause of the UN Charter; organised the formation of the Aboriginal Rights Organisation.
 Brigadier Geoffrey Austin Street, MP, MC (b.1894–d.1940): Australia's Minister of Defence in the First Menzies Government during World War II; awarded Military Cross for bravery in the Battle of Gallipoli; died as Minister of Defence in the Canberra Air Disaster of World War II; father of Anthony Austin.
 Commander Sir Laurence Whistler Street, AC, KCMG, KStJ, QC (1926–2018): 14th and second youngest Chief Justice of the Supreme Court of New South Wales and Lieutenant-Governor of New South Wales (1974–1989); son of Sir Kenneth and "Red Jessie", father of Alexander.
 Anthony Austin Street, MP, OM (1926–2022): Australia's Foreign Minister in the Fourth Fraser Ministry (1980–1983); Minister for Employment and Industrial Relations and Minister for Industrial Relations in the Third Fraser Ministry; son of Geoffrey Austin (held the same seat, Corangamite).
 Commander Alexander Whistler Street, SC (b.1959–): Incumbent judge of the Federal Circuit Court of Australia and Commander of the Royal Australian Naval Reserve, along with his sister Justice Sylvia Emmett (née Street), a federal judge and Lieutenant Commander in the naval reserve, and wife to federal judge Arthur Emmett.

Sullivan family
 Terry Sullivan (1949-), Member of the Queensland Legislative Assembly for Nundah (1991-1992), Chermside (1992-2001) and Stafford (2001-2006).
his son, Jimmy Sullivan (1982-), Member of the Queensland Legislative Assembly for Stafford (2020-)

Thorn/Harris/Hill/Casey family
 George Thorn (senior) (1806—1876), Member of the Queensland Legislative Assembly for West Moreton (1860—1861)
 his sons:
George Thorn (1838—1905), Premier of Queensland (1876—1877)
John Thorn (1847—1896), Member of the Queensland Legislative Assembly for Fassifern (1874—1878)
Henry Thorn (1840—1880), Member of the Queensland Legislative Assembly for Northern Downs (1867—1868, 1873—1876)
William Thorn, Member of the Queensland Legislative Assembly for Aubigny (1894—1904, 1908—1912)
 his son-in-law George Harris, Member of the Queensland Legislative Council
 George Harris's sons-in-law
 Charles Lumley Hill, Member of the Queensland Legislative Assembly for Gregory and Cook.
Richard Gardiner Casey, Member of the Queensland Legislative Assembly for Warrego
 Richard Casey's son Baron Casey, Governor-General of Australia

Walker family
James Thomas Walker (1841–1923), original senator from New South Wales (1901–1913);
his older cousin was Thomas Walker (1804–1886), member of NSW Legislative Council for Port Philip Bay (1843–1845);
(His mother's maiden name was Ann Walker)
his half cousin was William Benjamin Walker (1820–1889), member of the NSW Legislative Council  (1863–1867); and
his full uncle was James Walker(1785–1856), member of the NSW Legislative Council (1856–1856)

Wentworth/Hill/Griffiths/Scott/Cooper family
William Charles Wentworth I (1790–1872), member of the New South Wales Legislative Council for various periods between 1843 and 1862, including President of the Legislative Council (1861–1862)
D'Arcy Wentworth, Jr. (1793–1861), member of the NSW Legislative Council (1843–1845), brother of W. C. Wentworth I
William Charles Wentworth IV AO (1907–2003), member of the Australian House of Representatives (1949– 1977) and in the Ministry (1968–1972), great grandson of W. C. Wentworth I
George Neville Griffiths (1840–1905), member of the New South Wales Legislative Assembly (1882–1885), grandfather of W. C. Wentworth IV
John Scott) (1821–1898), apart from 1869, member of the Queensland Legislative Assembly (1868–1888) and of the Queensland Legislative Council (1888–1890), father-in-law of G.N. Griffiths and great grandfather of W. C. Wentworth IV
George Hill (1802–1883), Mayor of Sydney  (1850), alderman of the City of Sydney (1842–1851) and (1857–1858), and member of the NSW Legislative Council (1848–1849) and (1856–1861), great grandfather of W. C. Wentworth IV, his daughter, Mary Jane being the wife of Fitzwilliam, the son of W. C. Wentworth I
Richard Hill (1810–1895). Member of the NSW Legislative Assembly (1868–1877), member of the Legislative Council (1880–1895), brother of George Hill, and whose wife, Henrietta Cox, was the sister of Sarah, the wife of W. C. Wentworth I
William Charles Hill (1838–1919), member of the NSW Legislative Council (1900–1919), son of Richard Hill
Sir Daniel Cooper, 1st Baronet (1821–1902), member of the NSW Legislative Council (1849–1851) and (1855–1856), member of the NSW Legislative Assembly (1856–1860) and the Assembly's first Speaker, his wife Elizabeth being the sister of George Hill and Richard Hill

Whitlam family
 Gough Whitlam (1916–2014), MHR for Werriwa 1952–1978, Prime Minister 1972–75
 Tony Whitlam (1944–), MHR for Grayndler, Justice on the Federal Court of Australia (1993–2005)

Willmott family
 F. E. S. Willmott (1870–1941), MLA in Western Australia 1914–1921, MLC in Western Australia 1921–1926; father of F. D.
 Edmund Brockman (1882–1938), MLA in Western Australia 1933–1934; brother-in-law of F. E. S.
 William Willmott (1895–1947), MLA in Western Australia 1938–1947; nephew of F. E. S.
 F. D. Willmott (1904–2004), MLA in Western Australia 1955–1974; son of F. E. S.

Wilson family

Sir Keith Wilson was Senator for South Australia from 1938 to 1944 and MHR for Sturt from 1949–1954 and 1955–1966. His son 
Ian represented Sturt from 1966–1969 and 1972–1993 and was a minister in the Fraser government. Ian was also great-grandson of Sir John Langdon Bonython MHR for South Australia 1901–1906 and great-great grandson of Sir John Cox Bray, the first native born premier of South Australia

Wriedt family
Ken Wriedt (1927–2010) (Senator for TAS). Minister in the Whitlam Government. Daughter;
Paula Wriedt (born 1968) (MP) 1996–2009. Minister in the Tasmanian Government.

Others
John "Jack" Ah Kit was a member of the Northern Territory Legislative Assembly from 1995 to 2005, and was the first indigenous minister in the Northern Territory. His daughter, Ngaree Ah Kit, was elected to the Assembly in 2016.
Anthony Albanese has been a Member of the House of Representatives since 1996, and was a minister in the Rudd and Gillard governments. His wife, Carmel Tebbutt was a member of New South Wales Legislative Assembly from 2005 until her retirement in 2015, Education Minister 2005–2007, and Deputy Premier of the State of NSW from 2008–2011. They have been dubbed the "King and Queen of Marrickville". 
Jim Bacon was Premier of Tasmania 1998–2004, while his son, Scott Bacon was elected to the Tasmanian House of Assembly in 2010.
Francis Matthew John Baker was Member for Oxley 1931 to 1934 and Griffith 1934 to 1939. His father Francis Patrick Baker was Member for Maranoa
Martin Basedow was a member for Barossa in the South Australian Legislative Assembly from 1890 to 1902; his son Herbert Basedow was a member for the same seat from 1927 to 1930.
Wayne Berry was a member of the Australian Capital Territory Legislative Assembly for Ginninderra from 1989–2008 and Leader of the Opposition from 1997–1998. His daughter, Yvette Berry, has been a member of the Legislative Assembly for Ginninderra since 2012.
Jack Birney (1928–1995), was a Liberal member of the House of Representatives (representing the Sydney electorate of Phillip) from 1975 till his defeat in 1983. His son, Matthew John "Matt" Birney (born 1969) was Leader of the Opposition in Western Australia 2005–06.
George Booth was a member of the NSW Legislative Assembly 1925–1960, while his son, Ken Booth was a member from 1960 to 1988.
Bert Cremean and his brother Jack Cremean were both Labor members of the Victorian Legislative Assembly for Clifton Hill. Jack replaced his brother in a by-election after Bert died of peritonitis following surgery. The family (on their mother's side) was very active in local government Labor politics in the City of Richmond.
Mary Delahunty was a Labor member for Northcote in the Victorian Legislative Assembly from 1998 to 2006, and was Minister for Education (1999–2002); the Arts (1999 to 2006); Women's Affairs (2002–2006) and Planning (2002–2005). Her brother, Hugh Delahunty, was the National Party member for Lowan (2002–2014); and previously Wimmera (1999–2002) and was a minister in the Victorian Government.
Ray Groom was a Member of the House of Representatives 1975–1984, a Minister in the Fraser Government, a member of the Tasmanian House of Assembly 1986–2001, then Premier of Tasmania 1992–1996; his son, Matthew Groom was elected to the Tasmanian House of Assembly in 2010 and has been a minister in the Tasmanian Government since 2014.
James Guy was an ALP Senator for Tasmania from 1914 to 1920 and his son James Allan Guy was ALP and later Nationalist Member for Bass and a Senator for Tasmania. George McElwee, Member of the Tasmanian Legislative Council from 1940 to 1946, was James Guy's brother-in-law.
Eric Harrison was a Member of the House of Representatives seat of Wentworth from 1931 to 1956, the first Deputy Leader of the Liberal Party of Australia (1944 to 1956) and held several major portfolios. His daughter Shirley Walters was Liberal Party Senator for Tasmania from 1975 to 1993.
Alan Hunt was a member of the Victorian Legislative Council from 1961–1992. His son, Greg Hunt, is the federal member for Flinders, was Minister for the Environment in the Abbott and Turnbull governments and is currently Minister for Industry, Innovation and Science.
Rowley James was the Member for Hunter, New South Wales 1924–1958, while his son, Bertie James was Member for the same seat 1960–1980.
Harry Jenkins, Sr was Member of Parliament for Scullin, Victoria, 1969–1985, while his son, Harry Jenkins was the Member for the same seat from 1986 to 2013. They have both been Speaker of the House of Representatives.
Stan Knowles, Member for Macquarie Fields in the NSW Legislative Assembly 1981–1990; and his son, Craig Knowles, member for the same seat 1990–2005.
Michael Lavarch was Member of Parliament 1987–1996 and Attorney-General in the Keating Government 1993–1996. His wife, Linda Lavarch, was Member for Kurwongbah in the Queensland Parliament, from 1997 to 2009, and was Attorney-General in the Beattie government 2005–2006.
Dawn Lawrie, independent Member for Nightcliff in the Northern Territory Legislative Assembly, 1974–1983; her daughter, Delia Lawrie was Labor Member for Karama 2001–2016 and was Leader of the Opposition 2012–15.
John Lemmon was the Labor member for Williamstown in the Victorian Legislative Assembly from 1904 to 1955—at nearly 51 years, the longest term in the Victorian parliament's history. His son, Nelson Lemmon, was a federal Labor MP for the seats of Forrest (WA; 1943–1949) and St George (NSW; 1954–1955), and a minister in the Chifley government.
 George Miles served in the Western Australian Legislative Council from 1916 to 1950, his great niece Jo Vallentine was an Independent / Greens senator for Western Australia from 1985 to 1992 and his great-granddaughter Mary Jo Fisher was a Liberal Party senator for South Australia from 2007 to 2012.
Justin O'Byrne was a member of the Senate for Tasmania 1947–81, President of the Senate 1974–75, and Father of the Senate 1971–75; his distant cousin Michelle O'Byrne was Member for Bass 1998–2004, and Member of the Tasmanian House of Assembly since 2006; her brother, David O'Byrne, was Member for Franklin in the Tasmanian House of Assembly from 2010 to 2014.
Eric Ogilvie was a Labor Member for Wilmot in the Tasmanian House of Assembly from 1928–1940, his brother Albert Ogilvie was Premier of Tasmania 1934–1939 and Labor member for Franklin 1919–1939. His granddaughter Madeleine Ogilvie was elected as a Labor member for Denison in the Tasmanian House of Assembly in 2014.
Noel Padgham-Purich was a member of the Northern Territory Legislative Assembly for Tiwi 1977–1983; Koolpinyah 1983–1990; and Nelson 1990–1997. Her daughter, Kezia Purick, has been member for Goyder since 2008.
Sir Earle Page was Prime Minister of Australia in 1939 and a Country Party Member of the House of Representatives from 1919 to 1961. His grandson Donald Page was a member of the NSW Legislative Assembly from 1988 to 2015 and a minister in the NSW Government from 2011 to 2014.
Ian Prentice was a Liberal Party member of the Queensland Legislative Assembly for Toowong from 1980 to 1983. His wife, Jane Prentice, has been the federal member for the Queensland seat of Ryan since 2010.
Bess Price (Country Liberal Party) defeated her nephew, Labor MLA Karl Hampton, in the 2012 Northern Territory election and succeeded him as the member for Sturt in the Northern Territory Legislative Assembly until 2016. She was a minister in the NT Government. Karl held the seat from 2006 to 2012 and was also a minister in the NT Government.
Philip Ruddock was MP for Parramatta from 1973 until 1977, for Dundas from 1977 until 1993 and for Berowra from 1993 until 2016, was Immigration Minister 1996–2003 and Attorney-General 2003–2007 in the Howard Government and was Father of the Australian Parliament from 1998 until 2016. His father, Max Ruddock was Member of the New South Wales state parliament from 1962 to 1976 and a minister in the NSW Government.
Marie Tehan was a Liberal member of the Victorian Legislative Council from 1987 to 1992 and of the Victorian Legislative Assembly from 1992 to 1999. She was a minister in the Victorian Government. Her son Dan Tehan has been a Liberal member of the Australian House of Representatives since 2010.
Lindsay Thompson was a Liberal Party member of the Victorian Legislative Council from 1955 to 1970 and of the Victorian Legislative Assembly from 1970 to 1982. He was the 40th Premier of Victoria. His son Murray Thompson has been a Liberal Party member of the Victorian Legislative Assembly since 1992.
Kelvin Thomson was an MP in the Victorian Legislative Assembly from 1988–1995 and was MHR for Wills in the Australian Parliament from 1996 until his retirement in 2016. His ex-wife Marsha Thomson was a member of the Victorian Legislative Council (1999–2006) and has represented Footscray in the Victorian Legislative Assembly since 2006. She was the first Jewish woman to be a minister in any Australian Government serving in the Bracks and Brumby cabinets.
William and Richard Vale were brothers who both represented West Ballarat in the Victorian Legislative Assembly during the latter part of the 19th century. William's great-grandson, Monte Vale, was member of the Assembly for Greensborough (1967–70, 1973–77), while Monte's son Roger Vale was member of the Northern Territory Legislative Assembly for Electoral division of Stuart, 1974–1994.
Howard Venning was a Liberal member of the South Australian House of Assembly from 1968 to 1979. His son Ivan Venning was a Liberal member of the South Australian House of Assembly from 1990 to 2014.
David Watkins was Member for Newcastle 1901–1935, while his son David O. Watkins was Member for the same seat 1935–1958.
Donald Robert "Don" Willesee (1916–2003) was a member of the Australian Senate for Western Australia 1950–1975, and a minister in the Whitlam Government. His brother, William Francis Willesee (1911–2000) was a member of the Western Australian Legislative Council 1954–1974.
Sir Eric Willis was Member of the NSW Legislative Assembly for Earlwood 1950–1978, and was Premier of New South Wales for a few months in 1976. His brother Max Willis, was Member of the New South Wales Legislative Council 1970–1999.
Michael Wooldridge was a Member of the House of Representatives, and Minister for Health 1996–2001 in the Howard Government. His sister, Mary Wooldridge, has been a member of the Victorian Legislative Assembly since 2006 and a minister in the Victorian Government.
Jack Wright was Deputy Premier of South Australia from 1982 to 1985 and a Labor Member for Adelaide in the South Australian House of Assembly from 1971 to 1985. His son Michael Wright was the Labor member for Lee in the South Australian House of Assembly from 1997 to 2014 and a minister in the South Australian Government.

See also

Political families of South Australia

References

External links
Lumb, Martin (31 October 2012): Parliamentary relations: political families in the Commonwealth Parliament, Australian Parliamentary Library.
Members of the Queensland Legislative Council biographic portal, courtesy of the Queensland Parliamentary Library, details extensive familial connections between Queensland politicians –

 
Politics of Australia